is the first mini-album released by Japanese singer Maaya Sakamoto with music composed by Yoko Kanno. The songs "Afternoon Repose" and "Another Grey Day in the Big Blue World" are sung in English.

Track listing

Charts

References

Maaya Sakamoto albums
Albums produced by Yoko Kanno
2001 EPs
Victor Entertainment EPs
Japanese-language EPs